Alfonso Menéndez Vallín (born 31 May 1966 in Avilés, Asturias) is a Spanish archer and Olympic champion. He competed at the 1992 Summer Olympics in Barcelona, where he won a gold medal with the Spanish archery team, together with teammates Antonio Vázquez and Juan Holgado.

References

1966 births
People from Avilés
Living people
Spanish male archers
Olympic archers of Spain
Archers at the 1992 Summer Olympics
Olympic gold medalists for Spain
Olympic medalists in archery
Medalists at the 1992 Summer Olympics
Sportspeople from Asturias
20th-century Spanish people